The Statute of Northampton (2 Edw. 3) is legislation passed by the Parliament of England which met in Northampton in 1328. The parliament also ratified the Treaty of Edinburgh–Northampton which ended the First War of Scottish Independence.

List of chapters  
 (Confirmation of charters) c. 1
 (Pardons for felony, justices of assize, etc.) c. 2
 (Riding or going armed) c. 3
 (Sheriff) c. 4
 (Sheriff) c. 5
 (Confirmation of statutes, etc.) c. 6
 (Inquiry of past felons, etc.) c. 7
 (Commands in delay of justice) c. 8 — repealed by the Statute Law (Repeals) Act 1969, section 1 and Schedule, Part I
 (The staples) c. 9
 (Pardon of fines) c. 10
 (Common Bench) c. 11
 (Annexing hundreds to counties) c. 12
 (Process for past trespasses) c. 13
 (Measure, etc. of cloths imported) c. 14
 (Keeping of fairs) c. 15
 (Inquests) c. 16
 (Writs of deceit) c. 17

Riding armed 
Chapter 3 would later be argued in legal disputes in the United States of America about Second Amendment rights.  It said

Item,  it  is  enacted,  that  no  man  great nor  small,  of  what  condition  soever  he be,  except  the  King's  servants  in  his presence, and his ministers in executing of the King's precepts, or of their office, and such as be in their company assisting  them,  and  also  [upon  a  cry made  for  arms  to  keep  the  peace,  and the same in such places where such acts happen,] be so hardy to come before the King's  justices,  or  other  of  the  King's ministers  doing  their  office,  with  force and arms, nor bring no force in affray of the  peace,  nor  to  go  nor  ride  armed by  night  nor  by  day,  in  fairs,  markets, nor  in  the  presence  of  the  justices  or other ministers, nor in no part elsewhere, upon pain to forfeit their armour to the King, and their bodies to prison at the King's pleasure.

The modern relevance of the legislation has been disputed: firearms did not exist at the time, and it is not immediately clear whether "nor to go nor to ride armed" (originally ne de chivaucher ne de daler arme in Anglo-Norman French) referred to carrying weapons or to wearing armour; it is also not clear whether it should be read primarily as permitting riding armed in the context of an official militia or posse, or as a prohibition in other situations.

Qui tam 
Chapter 15 regulated fairs and in particular required a lord to follow a royal charter or established usage to keep  a  fair  open  "for  the Time  that they ought  to hold  it, and
no longer," with pre-publication of the closing time, subject to a fine for the lord and grievous punishment for the merchants if the fair stayed open longer.  Enforcement against sales after the closing time of the fair was strengthened three years later with qui tam provisions in the Sale of Wares after Close of Fair Act 1331 (5 Edw. 3 c. 5), allowing private citizens to prosecute cases and receive a quarter of the fines based on double the value of improperly sold goods.  This provision was not repealed until the Common Informers Act 1951.

See also 
 List of Acts of the Parliament of England to 1483

References

External links
 

English laws
1320s in law
History of Northampton
1328 in England
Political history of medieval England
Gun politics in the United States
Legal history of the United Kingdom